CRU is a six track EP by British punk rock band Gnarwolves released on 16 July 2012 through BSM Recordings and Tangled Talk Records. All six tracks would later appear on the compilation album Chronicles of Gnarnia.
All the song titles on this EP are references to the book Brave New World.

Track listing

Personnel
Gnarwolves
Thom Weeks - Vocals/Guitar
Charlie Piper - Vocals/Bass
Max Weeks - Drums

Production
Wolfmask - Art

References

2012 EPs
Big Scary Monsters Recording Company EPs
Gnarwolves albums